The Kingdom of Mutapa – sometimes referred to as the Mutapa Empire, Mwenemutapa, – was an African kingdom in Zimbabwe, which expanded to what is now modern-day Mozambique. 
The Portuguese term Monomotapa is a transliteration of the Shona royal title Mwenemutapa derived from a combination of two words Mwene meaning Prince or Lord, and Mutapa meaning land. Over time the monarch's royal title was applied to the kingdom as a whole, and used to denote the kingdom's territory on maps from the period.

History 

There are several Mutapa origin stories, the most widely accepted told by oral tradition is of the princes of Great Zimbabwe. The first "Mwene" was a warrior prince named Nyatsimba Mutota (Son of King Nyanhewe Matope) from the Kingdom of Zimbabwe who expanded the reach of the kingdom initially to discover new sources of salt in the north. It is believed Prince Mutota found salt in his conquest of the Tavara, a Shona subdivision. Another historical narrative of the empire's origins is that Prince Mutota had broken away from Great Zimbabwe after going to war with Prince Mukwati, (believed to have been either his brother or cousin) over control of the Kingdom.

Expansion 
Mutota's son and successor, Nyanhewe Matope, extended this new kingdom into an empire encompassing most of the lands between Tavara and the Indian Ocean. This empire had achieved uniting a number of different peoples in Southern Africa by building strong, well-trained armies and encouraging states to join voluntarily, offering membership in the Great council of the Empire to any who joined without resistance. Matope's armies overran the kingdom of the Manyika as well as the coastal kingdoms of Kiteve and Madanda. By the time the Portuguese arrived on the coast of Mozambique, the Mutapa Kingdom was the premier state in the region. He raised a strong army which conquered the Dande area of the Tonga and Tavara. The empire had reached its full extent by the year 1480 a mere 50 years following its creation.

Religion 
The Emperor Mutope had left the empire with a well-organised religion with a powerful priesthood. The religion of the Mutapa kingdom revolved around ritual consultation of spirits and of royal ancestors. Shrines were maintained within the capital by spirit mediums known as mhondoro. The mhondoro also served as oral historians recording the names and deeds of past kings.

Portuguese contact 
The Portuguese dominated much of southeast Africa's coast, laying waste to Sofala and Kilwa, by 1515. Their main goal was to dominate the trade with India; however, they unwittingly became mere carriers for luxury goods between Mutapa's sub-kingdoms and India. As the Portuguese settled along the coast, they made their way into the hinterland as sertanejos (backwoodsmen). These sertanejos lived alongside Swahili traders and even took up service among Shona kings as interpreters and political advisors. One such sertanejo, António Fernandes, managed to travel through almost all the Shona kingdoms, including Mutapa's metropolitan district, between 1512 and 1516.

The Portuguese finally entered into direct relations with the Mwenemutapa in the 1560s. They recorded a wealth of information about the Mutapa kingdom as well as its predecessor, Great Zimbabwe. According to Swahili traders whose accounts were recorded by the Portuguese historian João de Barros, Great Zimbabwe was a medieval capital city built of stones of marvellous size without the use of mortar. And while the site was not within Mutapa's borders, the Mwenemutapa kept noblemen and some of his wives there. By the 17th century, other Europeans would extensively describe Mutapa architecture through paintings. Olfert Dapper revealed four grand gateways which led to several halls and chambers in the Mutapa palace. The ceilings of the rooms in the palace were gilt with golden plates alongside ivory chandeliers which hung on silver chains and filled the halls with light.

In 1569, King Sebastian of Portugal made a grant of arms to the Mwenemutapa. These were blazoned: Gules between two arrows Argent an African hoe barwise bladed Or handled Argent – The shield surmounted by a Crown Oriental. This was probably the first grant of arms to a native of southern Africa; however it is unlikely that these arms were ever actually used by the Mwenemutapa.

The accidental crusade
In 1561, a Portuguese Jesuit missionary managed to make his way into the Mwenemutapa's court and convert him to Christianity. This did not go well with the Muslim merchants in the capital, and they persuaded the king to kill the Jesuit only a few days after his baptism. This was all the justification the Portuguese needed to penetrate the interior and take control of the gold mines and ivory routes. After a lengthy preparation, an expedition of 1,000 men under Francisco Barreto was launched in 1568. They managed to get as far as the upper Zambezi, but local disease decimated the force. The Portuguese returned to their base in 1572 and took their frustrations out on the Swahili traders, whom they massacred. They replaced them with Portuguese and their half-African progeny who became prazeiros (estate holders) of the lower Zambezi. Mutapa maintained a position of strength exacting a subsidy from each captain of Portuguese Mozambique that took the office. The Mwenemutapa also levied a duty of 50 percent on all trade goods imported.

Decline and collapse
Mutapa proved invulnerable to attack and even economic manipulation due to the Mwenemutapa's strong control over gold production. What posed the greatest threat was infighting among different factions which led to opposing sides calling on the Portuguese for military aid. However, the Portuguese proved to be happy with the downfall of the Mutapa state.

Portuguese control
In 1629 the Mwenemutapa attempted to throw out the Portuguese. He failed and in turn he himself was overthrown, leading to the Portuguese installation of Mavura Mhande Felipe on the throne. Mutapa signed treaties making it a Portuguese vassal and ceding gold mines, but none of these concessions were ever put into effect. Mutapa remained nominally independent, though practically a client state. All the while, Portugal increased control over much of southeast Africa with the beginnings of a colonial system. The Portuguese were now in control of the trade and the trade routes.

Loss of prestige

Another problem for Mutapa was that its tributaries such as Kiteve, Madanda and Manyika ceased paying tribute. At the same time, a new kingdom under a Rozvi dynasty near Barwe was on the rise. All of this was hastened by Portugal retaining a presence on the coast and in the capital. At least one part of the 1629 treaty that was acted on was the provision allowing Portuguese settlement within Mutapa. It also allowed the praezeros to establish fortified settlements across the kingdom. In 1663, the praezeros were able to depose Mwenemutapa Siti Kazurukamusapa and put their own nominee, Kamharapasu Mukombwe on the throne.

Butwa invasion 
In the 17th century, a low ranking Mutapa prince broke away from the Empire, invading the neighboring kingdom of Butua. The leader of this Dynasty became known as Changamire Dombo. A possible reason for the breakaway was Dombo's dissatisfaction with the levels of Portuguese interference in the Mwenemutapa Empire's governance.

By the late 17th century, Changamire Dombo was actively challenging Mutapa. In 1684 his forces encountered and decisively defeated those of Mwenemutapa Kamharapasu Mukombwe just south of Mutapa's metro district at the Battle of Mahungwe. When Mukombwe died in 1692, a succession crisis erupted. The Portuguese backed one successor and Dombo another. In support of his candidate, Changamire Dombo razed the Portuguese fair-town of Dembarare next to the Mutapa capital and slaughtered the Portuguese traders and their entire following. From 1692 until 1694, Mwenemutapa Nyakambira ruled Mutapa independently. Nyakambira was later killed in battle with the Portuguese who then placed Nyamaende Mhande on the throne as their puppet.

In 1695, Changamire Dombo overran the gold-producing kingdom of Manyika and took his army east and destroyed the Portuguese fair-town of Masikwesi. This allowed him complete control of all gold-producing territory from Butwa to Manyika, supplanting Mutapa as the premier Shona kingdom in the region.

Shifting rulers
It appears neither the Rozwi nor the Portuguese could maintain control of the Mutapa state for very long, and it moved back and forth between the two throughout the 17th century. Far from a victim of conquest, the Mutapa rulers actually invited in foreign powers to bolster their rule. This included vassalage to Portuguese East Africa from 1629 to 1663 and vassalage to the Rozwi Empire from 1663 until the Portuguese return in 1694. Portuguese control of Mutapa was maintained or at least represented by an armed garrison at the capital. In 1712, yet another coveter of the throne invited the Rozwi back to put him on the throne and kick out the Portuguese. This they did, and Mutapa again came under the control of the Rozwi Empire. The new Mwenemutapa Samatambira Nyamhandu I become their vassal, while the outgoing king was forced to retreat to Chidama in what is now Mozambique.

Independence and move from Zimbabwe
The Rozwi quickly lost interest in Mutapa, as they sought to consolidate their position in the south. Mutapa regained its independence around 1720. By this time, the kingdom of Mutapa had lost nearly all of the Zimbabwe plateau to the Rozwi Empire. In 1723, Nyamhandi moved his capital into the valley near the Portuguese trading settlement of Tete, under Mwenemutapa Nyatsusu. Upon his death in 1740, the young Dehwe Mapunzagutu took power. He sought Portuguese support and invited them back to Mutapa along with their garrison of armed men, but Mutapa remained independent.

Collapse

The Mwenemutapa died in 1759, sparking yet another civil war for the throne. This one was more destructive than its predecessors and Mutapa never recovered. The "winners" ended up governing an even more reduced land from Chidima. They used the title Mambo a Chidima and ruled independently of Portugal until 1917 when Mambo Chioko, the last king of the dynasty, was killed in battle against the Portuguese.

Mutapa as Ophir 
The empire had another indirect side effect on the history of southern Africa. Gold from the empire inspired in Europeans a belief that Mwenemutapa held the legendary mines of King Solomon, referred to in the Bible as Ophir.

The belief that the mines were inside the Mwenemutapa kingdom in southern Africa was one of the factors that led to the Portuguese exploration of the hinterland of Sofala in the 16th century, and this contributed to early development of Mozambique, as the legend was widely used among the less educated populace to recruit colonists. Some documents suggest that most of the early colonists dreamed of finding the legendary city of gold in southern Africa, a belief mirroring the early South American colonial search for El Dorado and quite possibly inspired by it. Early trade in gold came to an end as the mines ran out, and the deterioration of the Mutapa state eliminated the financial and political support for further developing sources of gold.

Legacy

For several centuries, this trading empire enabled people across a large territory to live in peace and security under a stable government and succession of rulers. With primary records dating back to 1502, the empire is a "prime testing ground for theories … concerning economic, political and religious development" in pre-colonial Africa.Beach comments that the Mutapa was one of only four Shona states that was not entirely "uprooted by new settlements of people" and the only one "close to Portuguese centers" thus providing important data on contact and relationships between this and other Shona states as well as with Europeans. The Mutapa Empire is an example of a working system of government in Africa and of a flourishing civilization, both of which are often assumed to have been absent before the coming of the Europeans.

See also
Great Zimbabwe
History of Zimbabwe
List of rulers of Mutapa
Nehanda Nyakasikana

References

Sources
 
 
 

 1.0 1.1 D.N. Beach, The Mutapa Dynasty: A Comparison of Documentary and Traditional Evidence, History in Africa 3(1976): 1-17.

D.N. Beach, Review: The Mutapa State by D.N. Beach. The Journal of African History. 17(2): 311-313.

Further reading 
 Elkiss, T.H.  The Quest for an African Eldorado: Sofala, Southern Zambezia, and the Portuguese, 1500–1865.  Waltham, MA: Crossroads Press, 1981.

Former countries in Africa
Former empires
Former monarchies of Africa
History of Zimbabwe
History of Mozambique
African civilizations
States and territories established in the 15th century
1760 disestablishments in Africa
States and territories established in 1430
States and territories disestablished in 1760
15th-century establishments in Africa
Ophir